The Treaty of Rouen was signed on 26 August 1517 between France and Scotland. The treaty provided the renewal of the Auld Alliance in terms of mutual military assistance and reciprocal aid. Provision was made for the future marriage of James V of Scotland to a daughter of Francis I if circumstances allowed.

The treaty was negotiated and signed by Duke of Albany and Charles, Duke of Alençon. Gavin Douglas, the Bishop of Dunkeld, was advising at Rouen. The issue of the marriage was conditional and secondary to the main matter of the treaty which detailed undertakings and troop numbers to be provided in the case of English invasion of France or Scotland. Aid from France was including financial support (100 000 "louis soleil") and a contingent of 1500 landsknechts, 500 foot soldiers and 200 archers. Scotland would send 6 000 men. At the time of the treaty Francis's daughter was promised elsewhere.

Footnotes

Sources
Dunlop, Annie I., The Letters of James V by Robert Kerr Hannay, Denys Hay, James V. The English Historical Review: Volume 70, No. 277, pp. 636–639, (October 1955), review article
Hay, Denys, The Letters of James V (HMSO, 1954)

See also
List of treaties

External links

Why did the "Rough Wooing" Fail to break the Auld Alliance?

1517 treaties
Rouen
1517 in France
1517 in Scotland
Rouen
Auld Alliance
History of Rouen